Anna-Jonesboro Community High School (AJCHS) is an American high school located in Anna, Illinois. Its principal is Mr. Brett Detering. It serves Anna and Jonesboro. It is a part of Anna-Jonesboro Community High School District 81.

In 2019 all of the teachers were non-Hispanic white.

Notable alumni
Clyde L. Choate, Medal of Honor winner and member of the Illinois House of Representatives

See also
Elementary and middle school districts serving Anna and Jonesboro:
 Anna Community Consolidated School District 37
 Jonesboro Elementary School District

References

External links
 

Schools in Union County, Illinois
Public high schools in Illinois